The Pascoe Vale Sports Club  is an Australian rules football club 11 km north-west of Melbourne in the suburb of Pascoe Vale. The club is affiliated with the Essendon District Football League.

History
The club was founded in 1918 and moved to its current location at Raeburn Reserve in 1925.

The 1930s saw the club compete in the Victorian Football Association Sub District competition against clubs  as West Melbourne Football Club North Melbourne Football Club, West Coburg Football Club, Footscray Football Club, Windsor, West Preston Football Club and were runners up in 1935.

During the latter part of the 1930s the club transferred to the Victorian Football League Sub District competition, and played against South Melbourne District, Richmond, District, East Brunswick, Kew, Fairfield, Sunshine Football Club. During this period the club was seen as Essendon Football Club  thirds. Open age sides during  the war were not fielded but the club's under 18s and under 21s were known as Sons of Soldiers.

The club won its first senior premiership in the League Sub District competition in 1946 and was runners up in 1947.

1952, the club changed its name to Raeburn Football Club to enable it to join the Essendon District Football League only to change back to Pascoe Vale in 1953.

1988 the club won their first B Grade Essendon District Football League premiership and had to wait until 2011 for their second B Grade premiership.

Pascoe Vale Football Club began fielding junior teams in 1956 with the formation of an under 15 team. The club now fields fourteen Under Age teams.

In 2016 the Pascoe Vale Sports Club was founded to take over the running of the Pascoe Vale Football Club and the Pascoe Vale Hadfield Cricket Club.

Senior Premierships (4)
Victorian Football League Sub Districts
1946
Essendon District FL B Grade
1988, 2011
Essendon District FL C Grade
1964.

References

External links

 Footypedia
 EDFL Homepage

Essendon District Football League clubs
1918 establishments in Australia
Australian rules football clubs established in 1918
Sport in the City of Merri-bek
Australian rules football clubs in Melbourne